Excuse My Dust! is a surviving 1920 American silent comedy-drama film produced by Famous Players-Lasky and distributed by Paramount Pictures. It is based upon a Saturday Evening Post short story "The Bear Trap" by Byron Morgan. Sam Wood directed Wallace Reid. Reid's young son, Wallace Jr., makes his first screen appearance here. This film is preserved in the Library of Congress.

Plot
As described in a film magazine, "Toodles" Walton (Reid), former automobile racer, has promised his wife Dorothy (Little) that he will refrain from speeding. But he gives into temptation and, through the influence of his father-in-law Mr. Ward (Roberts), the judge deprives him of the right to pilot a car for six months. Troubled times follow Toodles. He nearly runs over and kills his child, his wife leaves him, and his father-in-law's automobile business, of which he is manager, is being plotted against by its competitors. An automobile race from Los Angeles to San Francisco is planned by the competitors in hope of obtaining the plans of Ward's new motor. A midnight auto race, a collision, and an exciting finish puts Toodles in San Francisco, where his child is ill. The competing company fails in its scheme and Toodles' wife forgives him.

Cast
Wallace Reid as 'Toodles' Walton
Wallace Reid Jr. as 'Toodles' Jr.
Ann Little as Dorothy Ward Walden
Theodore Roberts as J.D. Ward
Guy Oliver as Darby
Otto Brower as Max Henderson
Tully Marshall as President Mutchler
Walter Long as Ritz

unbilled
James Gordon as Griggs
Jack Herbert as Oldham
Fred Huntley as Police Magistrate
Byron Morgan (minor role)
Will M. Ritchey (minor role)

See also
Wallace Reid filmography

References

External links

1920 films
American silent feature films
American auto racing films
American black-and-white films
Films directed by Sam Wood
Films based on short fiction
Famous Players-Lasky films
1920 comedy-drama films
1920s American films
Silent American comedy-drama films
1920s English-language films